Emanuel Lodewijk Elte (16 March 1881 in Amsterdam – 9 April 1943 in Sobibór) was a Dutch mathematician. He is noted for discovering and classifying semiregular polytopes in dimensions four and higher.

Elte's father Hartog Elte was headmaster of a school in Amsterdam. Emanuel Elte married Rebecca Stork in 1912 in Amsterdam, when he was a teacher at a high school in that city. By 1943 the family lived in Haarlem. When on January 30 of that year a German officer was shot in that town, in reprisal a hundred inhabitants of Haarlem were transported to the Camp Vught, including Elte and his family. As Jews, he and his wife were further deported to Sobibór, where they were murdered; his two children were murdered at Auschwitz.

Elte's semiregular polytopes of the first kind 

His work rediscovered the finite semiregular polytopes of Thorold Gosset, and further allowing not only regular facets, but recursively also allowing one or two semiregular ones. These were enumerated in his 1912 book, The Semiregular Polytopes of the Hyperspaces. He called them semiregular polytopes of the first kind, limiting his search to one or two types of regular or semiregular k-faces. These polytopes and more were rediscovered again by Coxeter, and renamed as a part of a larger class of uniform polytopes. In the process he discovered all the main representatives of the exceptional En family of polytopes, save only 142 which did not satisfy his definition of semiregularity.

(*) Added in this table as a sequence Elte recognized but did not enumerate explicitly

Regular dimensional families:
 Sn = n-simplex: S3, S4, S5, S6, S7, S8, ...
 Mn = n-cube= measure polytope: M3, M4, M5, M6, M7, M8, ...
 HMn = n-demicube= half-measure polytope: HM3, HM4, M5, M6, HM7, HM8, ...
 Crn = n-orthoplex= cross polytope: Cr3, Cr4, Cr5, Cr6, Cr7, Cr8, ...

Semiregular polytopes of first order:
 Vn = semiregular polytope with n vertices

Polygons
 Pn = regular n-gon
Polyhedra:
 Regular: T, C, O, I, D
 Truncated: tT, tC, tO, tI, tD
 Quasiregular (rectified): CO, ID
 Cantellated: RCO, RID
 Truncated quasiregular (omnitruncated): tCO, tID
 Prismatic: Pn, APn

4-polytopes:
 Cn = Regular 4-polytopes with n cells: C5, C8, C16, C24, C120, C600
 Rectified: tC5, tC8, tC16, tC24, tC120, tC600

See also 
 Gosset–Elte figures

Notes

1881 births
1943 deaths
Dutch mathematicians
Dutch Jews who died in the Holocaust
Scientists from Amsterdam
Dutch people who died in Sobibor extermination camp
Dutch civilians killed in World War II